Gupo Island, also transliterated as Koba Island, is an island in Baisha Township, Penghu County, Taiwan.

Demographics

The island is uninhabitated.

Economy
Nearby residents come to the island for laver harvest in early winter every year.

See also
 List of islands of Taiwan

References

Baisha Township
Islands of the South China Sea
Islands of Taiwan
Landforms of Penghu County
Penghu Islands
Taiwan Strait